The 1977 World Rally Championship was the fifth season of the Fédération Internationale de l'Automobile (FIA) World Rally Championship (WRC). The schedule was expanded by one event to 11, with some changes to the locations visited. Morocco was dropped from the schedule while new rallies were introduced in Quebec and New Zealand.

Due to internal politics within the company, Lancia failed to mount a significant effort to capture a fourth consecutive Championship. Instead, corporate partner Fiat led the fight against Ford, ultimately triumphing in a tightly contested battle that lasted most of the year.

From 1973 to 1978, the WRC only awarded a championship for manufacturers. Scoring was modified in 1977 to a more complex system including points both for overall and group placement. A car would still have to place in the overall top 10 to score points.

In addition to the Championship for Manufacturers, the FIA began awarding the FIA Cup for Rally Drivers. A total of 20 events were part of this series, including all rallies of the WRC, the five coefficient 4 rallies from the European Championship and four FIA Special Events. Only the best 8 results were counted towards the title: five WRC rallies, two ERC rallies and one Special Event.

Events

Map

Schedule and results

Manufacturers' championship

Cup for drivers 

 Waldegård had to drop one of his best results in WRC events because he didn't take part in at least one ERC event, as provided by the regulations.

See also 
 1977 in sports

External links

 FIA World Rally Championship 1977 at ewrc-results.com

World Rally Championship
World Rally Championship seasons